Russian folk dance is an important part of Russian culture. Some of the unique characteristics suggest that many elements were developed by the early Russian population.

History

Many Russian dances became known from the 10th century. Russia witnessed various invasions from other countries. Due to its location and size the country also came into contact with many different cultures through migration and trading. In turn, a Eurasian cultural mix of music and dance helped develop Russian folk dances.

Many of these early dances were performed and practiced by the lower classes. Typically the upper classes would watch performers rather than participate in the dances themselves.

The original Russian folk dance traditions continue to play an important part in the culture of the country and have been in constant interaction with Russia’s many ethnic groups. Russian folk dances are also in interrelations with other types of artistic expressions. One example can be seen in the Ballets Russes, which invokes Russian folk dances and music in its pieces.

Costumes

Costumes for concert dance are beautifully designed with great detail. Typically, the clothing for the dances is based on specific events, such as holidays, and varies between these events. Women wear holiday headdresses, embroidered shirts, belts, and ornamented aprons. Men wear shirts, a belt, narrow trousers, and high red boots. The color red is incorporated in many of the costumes because it is  associated with beauty in the Russian tradition.  In Russian dances woman and girls often carry a pocket square with them. Girls and women often wear the traditional Russian headdress kokoshnik during performances.

Characteristics
Both furious and gentle music is the basis for Russian dances.

Probably the most famous characteristics of Russian male dances are the Russian squat work (knee bending elements), stomping and the  split jumps (also Russian split or Russian jump). Split jumps exist in similar forms in Chinese dance. Dance features of this kind usually use expeditious music which changes its tempo over time. Russian squat work and knee bending movements are usually carried out by the male dancers. In Russian dance it is also common for male dancers to stomp, clap and strike the sole, front of the foot, thighs, knees and the chest with their hands held flat, similar to the German Schuhplattler, but in a much faster tempo.

The Russian circle dance Horovod has its roots in ancient Slavic traditions and exists in similar forms in Balkans (Choros in Greece), in Middle Eastern cultures and in China.

Russian dances

 Barynya
 Kamarinskaya
 Khorovod
 Kozachok
 Squat dance
 Troika
 Tropak
 Yablochko
 Beryozka

See also 
 List of ethnic, regional, and folk dances by origin
 Russian traditional music

References

External links 

 Our Russian Folk Dance from the Kennedy Center's ArtsEdge program.
 

 
European folk dances
Dances
Partial squatting position